1981 is a calendar year.

1981 may also refer to:

1981 (film), a 2009 film by Ricardo Trogi
"1981" (song), a song by Gyroscope
H.R. 1981, the Protecting Children from Internet Pornographers Act of 2011